The Al Jahra Force was a Kuwait task force, of roughly brigade strength, requested by then, Kuwait Minister of Defense, Sheikh Saad Al-Salim Al-Sabah and formed by Major General Mubarak Abdullah Al-Jaber Al-Sabah and his deputy Brigadier General Saleh Mohammed Al-Sabah; subsequently being tasked to the respective combat commanders on October 15, 1973, after the outbreak of the Yom Kippur War. The force, consisting of more than 3,000 men, was organized into a Tank Battalion, an infantry battalion, two companies of artillery, an anti-aircraft company and a combat company of the Kuwait 25th Commando Brigade. In addition, the task force also included medical, engineering and signal units. The brigade remained active until the end of September 1974, and then returned to Kuwait after a farewell ceremony in Damascus.

The task force was equipped with Vickers main battle tanks, Ferret armoured car, and Alvis Saracen. The first combat company equipped artillery batteries type Mk F3 155mm self-propelled guns  while the second combat company packed 120 mm mortars type. The anti-tank combat units were equipped with Carl Gustav recoilless rifle. The anti-aircraft combat company was equipped with triple barrel anti-aircraft guns type 20 mm.

See also
 Chief of the General Staff (Kuwait)
 Fahad Al-Ahmed Al-Jaber Al-Sabah
 Military of Kuwait
 1973 Samita border skirmish

References

Yom Kippur War
Military of Kuwait
History of Kuwait
Military units and formations established in 1973
Military units and formations disestablished in 1974